Christopher Willis House is a historic home located at Dresden in Yates County, New York. It is a Greek Revival/Italianate style structure built about 1830.

It was listed on the National Register of Historic Places in 1994.

References

Houses on the National Register of Historic Places in New York (state)
Italianate architecture in New York (state)
Houses completed in 1830
Houses in Yates County, New York
1830 establishments in New York (state)
National Register of Historic Places in Yates County, New York